"Zingolo" is the name of both a television advertisement for Cadbury's Dairy Milk in the UK in September 2009, and a single by Tinny released the same month, which features in the advertisement.

The song, "Zingolo", was released on the newly established record label Glass and a Half Full Records, established by Cadbury's Dairy Milk following their move to Fairtrade chocolate.
The song, and the record label, were also set up to celebrate "all things Ghana, its people, its rappers, its dancers, its cultural figures and, of course, its cocoa beans"
Although featuring a range of musicians, it is credited to a single artist, Tinny, from the label.

The advertisement was broadcast on television and cinema. Featuring a 1-minute edit of the song, it is a short music video showing Ghana and a "cocoa head". It is the fourth advertisement in the Glass and a Half Full Productions campaign, which began in 2007 with the award-winning Gorilla advertisement.

References

British television commercials
2000s television commercials
2009 singles
Ghanaian culture
2009 songs